Prudhoe Bay Oil Field is a large oil field on Alaska's North Slope. The amount of recoverable oil in the field is more than double that of the next largest field in the United States by acreage (the East Texas Oil Field), while the largest by reserves is the Permian Basin (North America). The field was operated by BP; partners were ExxonMobil and ConocoPhillips until August 2019; when BP sold all its Alaska assets to Hilcorp.

Location
It is on the North Slope and lies between the National Petroleum Reserve–Alaska to the west and the Arctic National Wildlife Refuge to the east.

Leasing
The State of Alaska owns the land and leases the area as the Prudhoe Bay Unit.  In the terminology that the State of Alaska uses in its leasing program, the "Prudhoe Bay Oil Field" is called the Prudhoe Bay Oil Pool.   Oil pools within the Prudhoe Bay Unit include the following – maps showing the location of each pool are in the associated reference.

History

The area was originally identified as a potential oil field and selected in the early 1960s as part of the 100 million acres the federal government allotted to the new state of Alaska under the Alaska Statehood Act as a form of economic support. Tom Marshall, a key state employee tasked with selecting the 100 million acres, said the geology reminded him of big oil basins he'd seen in Wyoming. Commercial oil exploration started in Prudhoe Bay area in the 1960s and, after a number of fruitless years, a rig produced a natural gas flare in December 1967. The oil field was confirmed on March 12, 1968, by Humble Oil (which later became part of Exxon) and Atlantic Richfield Company (ARCO), with the well Prudhoe Bay State #1. ARCO was the operating partner. Drilling sites for the discovery and confirmation wells were staked by geologist Marvin Mangus. BP was among the companies that had been active in the region, and BP was able to establish itself as a major player in the western part of the Prudhoe field. The field was initially operated as two separate developments, the BP Western Operating Area and the ARCO Eastern Operating Area. Upon acquisition of ARCO by BP and sale of ARCO Alaska assets to Phillips Petroleum in 2000, the two operating areas were consolidated and BP became the sole operator of the field. Production did not begin until June 20, 1977 when the Alaska Pipeline was completed.

The site of the field's discovery was listed on the National Register of Historic Places in 2000, and has a commemorative marker.  A well was operated at that site until 1985.

Operations
The field was initially operated as two separate developments, the BP Western Operating Area (WOA: Oil Rim) and the ARCO Eastern Operating Area (EOA: Gas Cap). Upon acquisition of ARCO by BP and sale of ARCO Alaska assets to Phillips Petroleum in 2000, the two operating areas were consolidated and BP became the sole operator of the field.

In the field, oil is moved through pipelines from about 1000 wells to a pumping station at the head of the Trans-Alaska Pipeline; "flow lines" carry oil from the wells to local processing centers, then through "transit lines" to the pumping station. According to a 2007 recording of BP representative, to replace the "huge volume of material" BP removes from beneath the ground, sea water is injected that is collected from Prudhoe Bay, Alaska.

Production

As of August 2006, BP estimated that  of recoverable oil remain and can be recovered with current technology.

Hilcorp energy is the field operator at Prudhoe Bay and has engaged in an aggressive redevelopment of the aging field since taking over as operator in mid-2019 from BP.

Associated oil fields

The source rock for the Prudhoe Bay Oil Field and neighboring reserves is a potential source for tight oil and shale gas. As of 2013 mineral rights to 500,000 acres overlying the North Slope oil shale had been leased by Great Bear Petroleum whose principal is the petroleum geologist Ed Duncan.

Geology

The field is an anticline structure located on the Barrow Arch, with faulting on the north side of the arch and a Lower Cretaceous unconformity on the east.

Claims on petroleum seeps in the Cape Simpson area were first made in 1915 by a group consisting of T.L. Richardson, W.B. Van Valen, O. Hansen, B. Panigeo and Egowa after these last two, Eskimos, pointed out two large mounds fifty feet high and 200 feet in diameter.  Gold prospectors Smith and Berry also discovered these seeps and formed an investment group in San Francisco led by R.D. Adams, who funded an investigation led by the geologist H.A. Campbell.  His report noted disputing claims by Standard Oil Company.  This led to the establishment of the Naval Petroleum Reserve No. 4 in 1923, after which the Navy engaged the United States Geological Survey to survey the area from 1923 until 1926, who concluded the best objectives were Cretaceous rocks.  From 1943 until 1953, the Navy drilled eighty wells, including the area at Cape Simpson and Umiat but none flowed more than 250 barrels per day.

The discovery of the Swanson River Oil Field on the Kenai Peninsula in 1957 by the Richfield Oil Corporation prompted the company to send geologists to the Arctic starting in 1959 and seismic survey crews in 1963, which recorded a reconnaissance line across what was identified as the Prudhoe structure in 1964.  In 1965, during the state lease sale, Richfield partnered with Humble Oil and acquired leases over what was later identified as the gas cap while British Petroleum was awarded leases over the "oil ring".

In 1968, Prudhoe Bay State No. 1 encountered the Permian-Triassic Sadlerochit formation at 8200 feet which flowed gas at 1.25 million cubic feet per day with 20–27 per cent porosity and "tens of millidarcies" permeability. Oil, condensate and gas are produced from the Triassic, Ivishak sandstone. This reservoir was deposited as a complex amalgamation of fan deltas and alluvial fans. The continuity of this fan delta was shown to extend seven miles away when the ARCO-Humble Sag River State No. 1 well was drilled.

The original target of the Prudhoe Bay State No. 1 was the Mississippian Lisburne limestone, encountered at 8,800 feet and flowed 1,152 barrels of oil per day in the 9,505 to 9,825 foot interval along with 1.3 million cubic feet of gas. This initial oil was burned "because there wasn't ample storage", the flames of which were spotted by a passing airline.  The Department of Energy in 1991 estimated oil in place for this formation at 3.1 billion barrels.

Statistics
Statistics for the Greater Prudhoe Bay Field:

 Discovery well: Prudhoe Bay State #1
 Discovery date: December 26, 1967
 Step-out well March 1968 confirmed
 Production start: June 20, 1977
 Total field area: 
 Oil production wells: 1114
 Total capacity: 
 Produced:  as of March 28, 2013
 Total recoverable: 
 Remaining recoverable: 
 Peak production: 1.97 million barrels per day (1988)
 Natural gas:
 Total:  (estimated)
 Recoverable: 
 Greater Prudhoe Bay satellite fields:
 East Operating Area (formerly ARCO)(production start date: 1977)
 West Operating Area (BP Exploration)(production start date: 1977)
 Midnight Sun (production start date: 1998)
 Aurora (production start date: 2000)
 Orion (production start date: 2002)
 Polaris (production start date: 1999)
 Borealis (production start date: 2001)
 Ownership:
 BP Exploration (Operator): 26%
 ConocoPhillips.: 36%
 ExxonMobil: 36%
 Others: 2%
On 27 August 2019 BP announces the agreement to sell all its Alaska operations and interests to Hilcorp for $5.6 billion. The transaction includes interests in giant Prudhoe Bay field and Trans Alaska Pipeline.

March 2006 oil spill

On March 2, 2006, a worker for BP Exploration (Alaska) discovered an oil spill in western Prudhoe Bay. The spill was attributed to a pipeline rupture.

In October 2007, BP was found guilty to a misdemeanor violation of the Clean Water Act to resolve criminal liability relating to pipeline leaks of crude oil. As a result of the guilty plea, BP Alaska agreed to pay $20 million which included the criminal fine, community service payments and criminal restitution.

August 2006 shutdown

The March 2006 oil spill led the United States Department of Transportation to mandate that the transit lines be inspected for corrosion. As a result, BP announced on 6 August 2006 they had discovered severe corrosion, with losses of 70 to 81 percent in the 3/8-inch thickness of the pipe walls. Oil leaking was reported in one area, with the equivalent of four to five barrels of oil spilled. BP said it was surprised to find such severe corrosion and that it had been 14 years since they had used a  pipeline inspection gauge ("pig") to clean out its lines because the company believed the use of the pigging equipment might damage pipe integrity. BP Exploration announced that they were shutting down the oil field indefinitely, due to the severe corrosion and a minor leak in the oil transit lines.

BP initially estimated up to 2 to 3 months before the pipelines would be fully operational. This caused increases in world oil prices, and BP revised the estimated operational date to January 2007. London brent crude hit an intra-day high of $77.73/barrel, the all-time high, at that time, being $78.18/barrel. United States crude oil peaked at $76.67/barrel. The state of Alaska, which gets most of its revenue from taxing the oil industry, lost as much as $6.4 million each day until production restarted.

No part of the Alaska Pipeline was affected, although Alyeska said that lower crude oil volumes could slow pumping during the BP shutdown.

The field has since reopened.  In mid-June 2007, however, a small leak occurred in one of the pipelines that connect the field to the Trans-Alaska Pipeline, shutting down the field for a week.

In March 2009 the State of Alaska sued BP in matter number 3AN-09-06181-CI alleging that BP was negligent in its management of rigging operations and corrosion control in the transit lines leading from the field into pumping station one of the Trans Alaska Pipeline.  The state is seeking damages for lost royalty and tax revenues.  The case seems to have been dismissed in 2010.

See also
Mount Elbert Gas Hydrate Site

References

Further reading
 Jamison, H.C., Brockett, L.D., and McIntosh, R.A., 1980, Prudhoe Bay – A 10-Year Perspective, in Giant Oil and Gas Fields of the Decade: 1968–1978, AAPG Memoir 30, Tulsa: American Association of Petroleum Geologists, .

External links
 Oil and Gas Resources of the Arctic Alaska Petroleum Province
 NPRA
 Milne Point goes mainstream. Inc. oilfield (Alaska Business Monthly, April 1995.)
 Prudhoe Bay, Alaska Aerial photos from the Prudhoe Bay area, July 2010

1968 establishments in Alaska
ARCO
BP oil and gas fields
ConocoPhillips oil and gas fields
ExxonMobil oil and gas fields
Geography of North Slope Borough, Alaska
Industry in the Arctic
Oil fields in Alaska